Justice Barnes may refer to:

Alanson H. Barnes, associate justice of the South Dakota Supreme Court
Charles P. Barnes, associate justice of the Maine Supreme Judicial Court
John Barnes (judge), associate justice of the Wisconsin Supreme Court
John B. Barnes, associate justice of the Nebraska Supreme Court
Richmond P. Barnes, associate justice of the New Mexico Supreme Court
Wilson K. Barnes, associate justice of the Maryland Court of Appeals

See also
Paul D. Barns, associate justice of the Florida Supreme Court
Judge Barnes (disambiguation)